Reshef is an alternate spelling of Canaanite deity Resheph. It can also refer to:

People
 Tzali Reshef (born 1953), an Israeli politician affiliated with the Israeli Labor Party
 Reshef Hen (born 1968), an Israeli politician affiliated with the Shinui movement
 Amnon Reshef (born 1938), an Israeli major general and commander in the Yom Kippur War
 Shai Reshef (born 1955), an Israeli-American entrepreneur
 Reshef Levi (born 1972), an Israeli filmmaker and comedian
 Reshef Tenne (born 1944), an Israeli scientist

Other
 The fictional Reshef family are the protagonists of The Greenhouse, a 2012 TV series.
 Reshef neighbourhood of Herzliya, Israel
 Sa'ar 4-class missile boats, known as Reshef-class boats
 INS Reshef, the first of these boats, launched in 1973
 The 402nd Artillery Battalion of the 162nd Division of the Israeli Defense Forces, nicknamed "Reshef"
 Yu-Gi-Oh! Reshef of Destruction, a 2004 trading card video game for the Game Boy Advance